Ivan Supek (8 April 1915 – 5 March 2007) was a Croatian physicist, philosopher, writer, playwright, peace activist and humanist.

Early years and education
Supek was born in Zagreb, Croatia (still nominally under Austria-Hungary). During his high school days, he organized a local section of the Young Communist League of Yugoslavia at his school, and was a member of the League until the Hitler-Stalin Pact. On one occasion, he secretly smuggled a briefcase to a man in Vienna he later found to be Josip Broz Tito. After finishing grammar school in Zagreb in 1934, he continued pursuing his education in Vienna for a brief period, then moved to Zürich studying mathematics, physics, biology and philosophy. Increasingly interested in quantum physics and its philosophical consequences, he moved to Leipzig where in 1940 he obtained his PhD in physics under Werner Heisenberg. He worked on problems of superconductivity, but ultimately his doctoral dissertation was on electrical conductivity in metals in low temperatures. In March 1941 he was arrested by the Gestapo for being involved in antifascist activity and held in prison for many months. His professors, Heisenberg, Hund and von Weizsäcker intervened to release him from prison. Immediately after being released, instead of returning to Leipzig, he went back to Independent State of Croatia and joined the communist antifascist movement. He would not return to physics research again, focusing on his philosophical and literary work.

Public activity
Supek was a proponent of total and unconditional nuclear disarmament, having already in 1944, fourteen months before the bombing of Hiroshima warned on the danger of misuse of atomic energy.

In 1946 he became a professor of theoretical physics at the University of Zagreb. His main contribution to physics was the discovery of the differential equation for electrical conductivity at low temperatures. In 1950 he advocated the construction of the Ruđer Bošković institute in Zagreb and became one of its founders. He was excluded from it in 1958 due to his disagreement with the Yugoslav Federal Commission for Nuclear Energy and his unwillingness to participate in a project for building the atomic bomb (an idea Josip Broz Tito himself did not like much, and which was subsequently abandoned). After that, he stopped active research in theoretical physics and continued researching philosophy and literature.

In 1960 he was accepted into the Yugoslav Academy of Sciences and Arts (since 1991 the Croatian Academy of Sciences and Arts) of which he was president from 1991 to 1997, and in 1968 he became the rector of the University of Zagreb, serving two terms until 1972, during the turbulent times of the Croatian Spring. In 1960 he founded the Institute for the Philosophy of Science and Peace, as a section of the Yugoslav Academy of Sciences and Arts. The Institute was also a center of the nuclear disarmament movement, the Pugwash Conference for Yugoslavia, of which he was one of the founders and a member of its Permanent Committee. In 1970 he initiated the establishing of the Interuniversity Centre in Dubrovnik (IUC). He was also one of the founders of the international organization World without the Bomb. After numerous disputes and arguments with the government he was interrupted in his public activity in 1971. Among other incidents, he was put on a "black list" because of his involvement in the Croatian Spring movement.

In 1976 he signed the Dubrovnik-Philadelphia Statement, with Philip Noel-Baker, Ava Helen Pauling, Linus Pauling, Aurelio Peccei and Sophia Wadai. He participated at the Philadelphia Congress of World Unity in 1976. He formulated his famous ten humanistic principles, which were more or less repeated at every later peace summit and event. He also established the International League of Humanists.

Later years to present 

Supek visited and lectured at numerous foreign universities. He retired in 1985, but ever since continued his humanist work. He founded a citizen association, Alijansa za treću Hrvatsku (Alliance for the third Croatia). He was a critic of globalisation and a proponent of the global justice movement. In 2002 he was elected an honorary member of the Academy of Sciences and Arts of Bosnia and Herzegovina.

Supek died on 5 March 2007, in his home in Zagreb, after a long illness.

In 2007, shortly after his death, the "X. gimnazija" (10th Gymnasium) grammar school in Croatia's capital Zagreb was renamed in his honor to X. gimnazija "Ivan Supek".  He is among 24 famous Croats to be inducted in the Croatian Walk Of Fame.

Controversy over Heisenberg – Bohr 1941 meeting
In one of his last interviews in March 2006  Supek spoke about the famous and controversial meeting between Werner Heisenberg and Niels Bohr in Copenhagen in September 1941. According to Supek, he was informed in confidence by Bohr's wife Margrethe about the meeting. In his interview, Supek claimed that the main figure of the meeting was neither Heisenberg nor Bohr but Carl Friedrich von Weizsäcker. "Heisenberg and von Weizsäcker came to Bohr in German army uniforms. Von Weizsäcker's idea, probably originating from his father who was Ribbentrop's deputy, was to persuade Bohr to mediate for peace between Great Britain and Germany."

Although Margrethe allegedly thought Supek will never bring these details into public, Supek felt it was "his duty to announce these facts so that future generations can know the truth about the Heisenberg – Bohr meeting".

Disputes with president Tuđman
Supek had many disputes with the first president of independent Croatia, Franjo Tuđman. In a 1997 "open letter" which he also read on the national television and published in all the major dailies, president Tuđman accused Supek, then President of the Academy of Arts and Sciences, of supporting forces that allegedly plotted his assassination after Supek made public statements critical of presidential policies: he called for Tuđman to submit to public scrutiny his financial assets before and after the war. Supek had been a critic of Tuđman's political faux pas since Tuđman took office in 1990. Following the publication of the letter, Supek and his family suffered numerous death threats.

Literary works
Beside his scientific and humanist work, Supek wrote numerous novels and plays, with themes spanning from philosophy, science fiction to politics. His novel  (translated to The Process of the Century) is about the process against the physicist Robert Oppenheimer. A list of his works can be found on the Academy homepage. In 1966 he started a journal, Encyclopedia moderna.

In his numerous works, Supek developed a worldview in which the values of the freedom, responsibility, and democracy are integrated with his philosophical-scientific reflections.

Quotes
 About science and humanism in 1995:
"The diversity of the world cannot be overcome in a political system; whoever tried to do that only produced tyranny and misery. The richness of plurality and diversity will only be increased in the future. All the European and world organizations are not enough, and cannot be effective if not inspired by the universal spirit and consciousness nourished by science and art."

See also
 List of peace activists

References

External links
Obituary in Prolegomena, April 2008
Homepage at the Croatian Academy of Arts and Sciences
A biography at the website of the World Peace Summit
A summary of some of his plays
His Appeal for Peace
An article on the Tuđman – Supek dispute
 A March 2006 interview with professor Supek  (Jutarnji list)
 Ruđer Bošković Institute, Zagreb

1915 births
2007 deaths
Physicians from Zagreb
Academic staff of the University of Zagreb
Croatian physicists
Croatian dramatists and playwrights
Croatian novelists
Male novelists
Croatian essayists
Croatian male writers
Male essayists
Croatian pacifists
Croatian philosophers
Croatian agnostics
20th-century Croatian philosophers
Croatian humanists
Rectors of the University of Zagreb
Members of the Croatian Academy of Sciences and Arts
Members of the Academy of Sciences and Arts of Bosnia and Herzegovina
20th-century novelists
20th-century dramatists and playwrights
20th-century essayists
20th-century male writers